Saulo Rodrigues da Silva (born 17 June 1997), known as Saulo Mineiro or simply Saulo, is a Brazilian professional footballer who plays for Yokohama FC as a forward.

Career
Saulo was born in Uberlândia, Minas Gerais, and represented hometown side Uberlândia EC as a youth. He made his first team debut on 28 March 2017, in a 2–2 Campeonato Mineiro home draw against Cruzeiro; after coming on as a 61st minute substitute, he had to leave the field two minutes later due to an arm injury.

Saulo spent the rest of the 2017 campaign on loan at América Mineiro's under-20 squad. For the 2018 campaign, after again playing for Uberlândia, he also represented Uberaba and Araxá.

In April 2019, after brief stints at Tupi and CRAC, Saulo signed for Volta Redonda. On 4 September, he renewed his contract until 2021.

On 18 September 2020, after scoring five goals in only six matches of the 2020 Série C, Saulo moved straight to Série A with Ceará. He made his debut for the club on 25 October, replacing Cléber in a 2–1 home win against Coritiba.

Saulo scored his first goal in the top tier on 30 November 2020, netting his team's third in a 4–1 away success over Vasco da Gama.

Career statistics

References

External links

Ceará profile 

1997 births
Living people
People from Uberlândia
Brazilian footballers
Association football forwards
Campeonato Brasileiro Série A players
Campeonato Brasileiro Série C players
Campeonato Brasileiro Série D players
J1 League players
Uberlândia Esporte Clube players
Uberaba Sport Club players
Araxá Esporte Clube players
Tupi Football Club players
Volta Redonda FC players
Ceará Sporting Club players
Yokohama FC players
Brazilian expatriate footballers
Brazilian expatriate sportspeople in Japan
Expatriate footballers in Japan
Sportspeople from Minas Gerais